St. George's Cathedral is an historical Church Mission Society Anglican church in Freetown, Sierra Leone. The church was one of the grandest churches in Freetown, and had one of the highest attendance ratings for a church. It is now the Cathedral Church of the Anglican Diocese of Freetown. As an iconic edifice strongly associated with the Creole people of Sierra Leone, St George's Cathedral was described as "that bastion of Creoledom."

Building begun in 1817, and was completed in 1828.

References

Further reading
 A. E. Tuboku-Metzger, 'An Historical Sketch of St George's Cathedral, Freetown, 1828-1928', Sierra Leone Studies, No. 12 (O.S.), June 1928, pp. 7–10

Cathedrals in Sierra Leone
Churches in Freetown
1828 establishments
Churches completed in 1828
Anglican churches in Sierra Leone